The Social Democratic Party (PSD) is a political party in Gabon. It is part of the Presidential Majority coalition and is led by Pierre-Claver Maganga Moussavou.

History
The PSD was established in 1991. Maganga Moussavou was nominated as its candidate for the 1993 presidential elections, finishing fourth in a field of thirteen candidates with 3.6% of the vote. He ran again in the 1998 presidential elections, this time finishing fifth out of the eight candidates with 1% of the vote.

The party won a single seat in the National Assembly in the 2001 parliamentary elections, and subsequently joined the Gabonese Democratic Party (PDG)-led government. It did not put forward a candidate for the 2005 presidential elections, but won two seat in the 2006 parliamentary elections, in which it was part of the pro-PDG bloc.

Maganga Moussavou was nominated as the PSD candidate for the 2009 presidential elections, finishing sixth in a field of eighteen candidates with 0.8% of the vote. The party was reduced to one seat in the 2011 parliamentary elections.

References

Political parties in Gabon
Social democratic parties
Political parties established in 1991
1991 establishments in Gabon